Sir John Charles Tudor Vaughan  (4 February 1870 – 26 April 1929) was a British diplomat who was envoy to several countries.

Career
Vaughan joined the Diplomatic Service in 1894 and served in The Hague, Athens and Cairo before spending three years in South Africa. At Pretoria he was assistant private secretary to Sir Alfred Milner, then political secretary to Lord Roberts, then assistant secretary to the Administration of the Transvaal Republic. He was posted to Peking in 1901, to Constantinople (Istanbul) in 1903 and to Madrid in 1905; he was secretary to the British delegation, and a member of the drafting committee, at the Algeciras Conference in 1906, and was posted to Copenhagen later that year. He was chargé d'affaires at Santiago, Chile in 1911 and at Bucharest in 1912, and was posted back to Madrid in 1913.

Vaughan was Envoy Extraordinary and Minister Plenipotentiary to Chile 1918–22, to the Republics of Latvia and Estonia 1922–27 and concurrently  Envoy Extraordinary and Minister Plenipotentiary to Lithuania 1923–27, and finally to Sweden 1927–29.

Vaughan died at Stockholm while still in office. After a funeral service at St Peter and St Sigfrid's Church in Stockholm, his coffin was conveyed to England aboard the Swedish destroyer Ehrensköld. On arrival in England on 6 May 1929, Vaughan was buried at the Church in the Wood, Hollington, East Sussex.

In 1912 Tudor Vaugan's father Henry Vaughan and his sons and daughters added the name St Andrew to their surname, so that John Charles Tudor Vaughan became formally John Charles Tudor St Andrew-Vaughan. However, he continued to be known as Tudor Vaughan and official notices referred to him as John Charles Tudor Vaughan.

Honours
Tudor Vaughan was appointed MVO in 1908 and CMG in the New Year Honours of 1918. He was knighted KCMG in the 1925 Birthday Honours. The Danish government made him a Commander of the Order of the Dannebrog.

References
VAUGHAN, Sir (John Charles) Tudor (St Andrew-), Who Was Who, A & C Black, 1920–2015 (online edition, Oxford University Press, 2014)
Sir Tudor Vaughan: Varied Career As Diplomatist (obituary), The Times, London, 27 April 1929, page 11
The Late Sir Tudor Vaughan: Swedish Tributes, The Times, London, 29 April 1929, page 13

1870 births
1929 deaths
Ambassadors of the United Kingdom to Chile
Ambassadors of the United Kingdom to Latvia
Ambassadors of the United Kingdom to Estonia
Ambassadors of the United Kingdom to Lithuania
Ambassadors of the United Kingdom to Sweden
Knights Commander of the Order of St Michael and St George
Members of the Royal Victorian Order
Commanders of the Order of the Dannebrog